The 2014–15 Slovenian PrvaLiga was the 24th edition of the Slovenian PrvaLiga since its establishment in 1991. Also known by the abbreviation 1. SNL, PrvaLiga was contested by the top ten clubs in Slovenia, for the title of national champions.

Competition format
Each team played 36 matches (18 home and 18 away). Teams played four matches against each other (two at home and two away).

Stadiums and locations

1Seating capacity only. Some stadiums (e.g. Krka, Rudar) also have standing areas.
2Radomlje played their matches at the Domžale Sports Park because their stadium in Radomlje, roughly five kilometres from Domžale, did not meet the Football Association of Slovenia PrvaLiga stadia criteria.
3Zavrč played the first half of the season at the Ptuj City Stadium, with the capacity of 2,207 seats, because their regular stadium went through a major reconstruction.

League table

Standings

Positions by round

Results

First half of the season

Second half of the season

PrvaLiga play-off
The two-legged play-off between Gorica, the ninth-placed team of the 2014–15 PrvaLiga, and Aluminij, the second-placed team of the 2014–15 Second League, was played. The winner earned a place in the 2015–16 Slovenian PrvaLiga.

Gorica won 2–1 on aggregate.

Awards

PrvaLiga Player of the Season

Benjamin Verbič

PrvaLiga U23 Player of the Season

Benjamin Verbič

SPINS XI

Statistics

Goals

Source: Slovenian PrvaLiga

Assists

See also
2014 Slovenian Supercup
2014–15 Slovenian Cup
2014–15 Slovenian Second League

References
General

Specific

External links
 
2014–15 PrvaLiga at Soccerway.com

Slovenian PrvaLiga seasons
Sloven
1